Fernand Comparini (born 6 December 1896, date of death unknown) was a French racing cyclist. He rode in the 1929 Tour de France.

References

1896 births
Year of death missing
French male cyclists
Place of birth missing